EKF may refer to:
 EKF Diagnostics, a European healthcare company
 European Karate Federation
 European Kendo Federation
 Europe–Korea Foundation
 Extended Kalman filter